is a junction passenger railway station located in the city of  Tokushima, Tokushima Prefecture, Japan. It is operated by JR Shikoku and has two station numbers: "B01" for the Tokushima Line and "T01" for the Kōtoku Line.

Lines
Sako Station is served by both the Tokushima Line and the Kōtoku Line. Both the local and limited express services of the Tokushima Line run on to  but this latter station is not considered part of the line and it does not bear a station number with the "B" prefix.

On the Kōtoku Line, the station is 73.1 km from the beginning of the line at Takamatsu.

Only trains from the local services of the Tokushima and Kōtoku Lines stop at Sako. These trains also stop at Sako.

Layout
The station consists of an island platform serving 2 elevated tracks. A waiting area, kiosk and a JR ticket window (without a Midori no Madoguchi facility) located on the 1st level of the station. Steps and an elevator provide access to the island platform at the second level. Parking for bicycles is available under the elevated tracks.

Platforms

History
The station was opened Japanese Government Railways (JGR) on 20 March 1935 as an added station on the existing Tokushima Line (later the Tokushima Main Line). With the privatization of Japanese National Railways (JNR), the successor of JGR, on 1 April 1987, the station came under the control of JR Shikoku. On 1 June 1988, the line was renamed the Tokushima Line and Sako was designated as the official terminus.

Passenger statistics
In fiscal 2019, the station was used by an average of 856 passengers daily

Surrounding area
JR Shikoku Bus Tokushima Branch
Tokushima City Athletics Stadium

See also
List of railway stations in Japan

References

External links

 JR Shikoku timetable

Railway stations in Tokushima Prefecture
Railway stations in Japan opened in 1935
Tokushima (city)